Erik Martin Dilan (born May 11, 1974) is an American politician. A Democrat, Dilan represents the 54th district of the New York Assembly which comprises the Brooklyn neighborhoods of Bushwick, Cypress Hills, East New York, Ocean Hill, and Brownsville. Formerly, he represented the 37th district of the New York City Council from 2002 to 2014.

Early life, education, and early career
Dilan graduated from Norman Thomas High School, Philippa Schuyler Middle School, and P.S. 151. He later graduated from St. John’s University, earning an A.S. in Business Administration.

He was a member of Community School Board 32.

New York City Council

Elections
In 2001, incumbent Democrat NYC Councilman (and Dilan's father) Martin Malave Dilan of the 37th Council district decided to retire in order to run for the New York Senate. Dilan decided to run for his father's seat. He won the Democratic primary with a plurality of 33% of the vote. In the general election, Dilan won the seat with 87% and defeated three third party candidates. In 2003, he was challenged in the Democratic primary by just one candidate, State Senator Nellie R. Santiago, and defeated her 65%–35%. He won re-election to second term with 92% of the vote. In 2005, he was unopposed in the primary and won re-election to a third term with 84% of the vote. In 2007, he wasn't challenged at all to win a fourth term. In 2009, won re-election to a fifth term with 87% of the vote.

Committee assignments
He was chair of the Council's Housing & Buildings Committee, while also serving on the Rules, Privileges & Elections, Zoning & Franchises, and Rules committees.  While there, he refused to allow a bill to count all vacant properties in the city out of committee.  This was met with a sleep-out outside his office by activists with Picture the Homeless

He illegally acquired an "affordable housing" unit for which he exceeded the allowable income to qualify because of his connections in the real estate industry.  He was punished with a $9,000 fine in January 2015.

2012 congressional election

He said "We’ve had an incumbent who has been there for 20 years and she’s done little with the post. She’s going to have to justify after 20 years of nothing, why she should remain in office." Dilan took second place in the Democratic primary with 35% of the vote.

References

External links
2005 NYC Voter Guide: Candidate Profile: Erik Martin Dilan
Council Priorities: The new City Council Speaker doles out some surprising assignments

1974 births
Living people
Candidates in the 2012 United States elections
21st-century American politicians
Hispanic and Latino American state legislators in New York (state)
New York City Council members
Democratic Party members of the New York State Assembly
People from Bushwick, Brooklyn
St. John's University (New York City) alumni
Politicians from Brooklyn
Hispanic and Latino American New York City Council members